The Hoosier Plains Conference is an Indiana-based high school athletic conference formed in 2017.

Current Members

Former members

Conference Championships

Boys Basketball

Girls Basketball

Boys Soccer

Girls Soccer

Volleyball

References

Indiana high school athletic conferences
High school sports conferences and leagues in the United States